The Brazilian Confederation of Practical Shooting, Portuguese Confederação Brasileira de Tiro Pratico (CBTP), is the Brazilian association for practical shooting under the International Practical Shooting Confederation.

In 1996, CBTP hosted the IPSC Handgun World Shoot.

External links 
 Official homepage of the Brazilian Confederation of Practical Shooting

References 

Regions of the International Practical Shooting Confederation
Sports organisations of Brazil